Besa River is a river in northern British Columbia, Canada. It is a tributary of the Prophet River.

The river flows through the Muskwa Ranges, and is the backbone of the Redfern-Keily Provincial Park, part of the larger Muskwa-Kechika Management Area. It gives the name to the Besa River Formation, a stratigraphical unit of the Western Canadian Sedimentary Basin.

Course
The Besa River headwaters are found high in the Muskwa Ranges of the Northern Rockies, on the slopes of the Great Snow Mountain, Great Rock Peak, Mount Circe and Mount Eurylochos, where it draws water from glaciers such as the Ithaca Glacier. The river flows eastwards through the Redfern-Keily Provincial Park, established along the upper course of the Besa River and its tributaries. It flows east and south-east, between the peaks of Redfern Mountain to the north and Mount Ulysses and Mount Penelope to the south, receiving waters from the Achaean Glacier. It then flows through the Redfern Lake, then turns north around Mount Dopp, after receiving the waters of Fairy Lake and Nordling Creek. The Petrie Creek and Keily Creek also flow into the Besa River, which then turns east, then north again after receiving the Neves Creek. Granger Creek also flows in the Besa River west of Klingzut Mountain.

Its waters are carried via the Prophet River, Muskwa River, Fort Nelson River, Liard River and Mackenzie River, ultimately into the Arctic Ocean.

Tributaries
Ithaca Glacier
Achaean Glacier
Redfern Lake
Fairy Lake
Nordling Creek
Petrie Creek
Keily Creek
Neves Creek
Granger Creek

References

Rivers of British Columbia
Fort Nelson Country
Peace River Land District